Mathivanan Rajendran (born 12 January) is an Indian actor and film producer. He produces films under his production company, Stray Factory which produces independent Indian films. Most recent productions include Nirvana Inn (2019) and Nasir (2020).

Nirvana Inn premiered at the Busan International Film Festival in 2019 and Nasir premiered at the International Film Festival of Rotterdam 2020 winning the NETPAC award at the festival.

He is also the co-founder of Rascalas an online platform for South Indian content. In 2016 he produced one of South India's first web series Black Sheep. His plays have been performed at festivals across the globe including National Arts Festival and Hollywood Fringe Festival.

In 2022, he was named as a BAFTA Breakthrough Talent from India

Filmography

As producer

As actor

As voice actor

References

External links

1985 births
Living people
Tamil male actors
Male actors from Tamil Nadu
Male actors in Tamil cinema
21st-century Tamil male actors